Butter Pot Provincial Park is a Provincial Park on the Avalon Peninsula of the island of Newfoundland, Canada. The park covers an area of approximately 28 km2 and is located on the Trans-Canada Highway about 35 km southwest of St. John's.  The park is named for a prominent rounded hill (Butter Pot Hill, 303 m) inside the park boundary.  Butter Pot incorporates both day-use and overnight camping facilities, and in winter months provides groomed cross-country ski trails.

Butter Pot Provincial Park is the most-visited park in the Newfoundland provincial park system.  In September 2012, the park closed early for the season, as a result of extensive damage to the park roads, trails and facilities caused by Hurricane Leslie.

See also
List of Newfoundland and Labrador parks
List of Canadian provincial parks
List of National Parks of Canada

References

External links
 Park web site

Provincial parks of Newfoundland and Labrador